A Caretaker's Tale is a 2012 Danish drama film directed by theatre director  based on a screenplay by Kim Fupz Aakeson.

Plot 
Per (Lars Mikkelsen) is a bitter misogynist caretaker (building manager). His wife left him, his son is a drug addict, and his back hurts. In his spare time, he drinks beer with neighbour Viborg (Nicolaj Kopernikus). Then he suddenly finds a mysterious naked young woman (Julie Zangenberg) in an empty apartment. Per doesn't know what to do with the girl who is unable to talk, walk, or eat. The only thing she does is smile mysteriously. Then Per and his friends discover her special gift.

Cast 
 Lars Mikkelsen as Per
 Nicolaj Kopernikus as Viborg
 Julie Zangenberg as The Girl
 Peter Plaugborg as Carsten
 Tommy Kenter as Gregers
 Ditte Gråbøl as Britt

References

External links 
 
 

2012 films
2012 drama films
Danish drama films
Zentropa films